Chirunomula is a small village located in Bonakal Mandal of Khammam district, Telangana, India.

Administration 
Chirunomula is a village Panchayat under Bonakal intermediate Panchayat. The current elected Sarpanch of Chirunomula is Sakamuri Raja.

Education 
Chirunomula boasts of a High school which existed long before the Sub division Bonakal had a High school.
It has 2 primary schools
Mandal Parishad Primary School
Mandal Parishad Primary School for Scheduled Castes
The village has a literacy rate of around 51% according to 2001 census

References

Villages in Khammam district